Fortuyniidae is a family of mites belonging to the order Sarcoptiformes.

Genera:
 Alismobates Luxton, 1992
 Circellobates Luxton, 1992
 Fortuynia Hammen, 1960
 Litoribates Pfingstl & Schatz, 2017

References

Sarcoptiformes